Wandering Footsteps is a 1925 American silent melodrama film directed by Phil Rosen and starring Alec B. Francis, Estelle Taylor, and Bryant Washburn. Based upon the novel A Wise Son by Charles Sherman, it was released on October 23, 1925.

Plot
As described in a film magazine review, an intoxicated young man meets a similarly conditioned old man while wandering in a park and decides to adopt him as his father. The young man's fiancé resents this act and the old man, desirous of seeing the young people happy, goes his way. Later, the men meet again, and this time stay together and help each other find happiness.

Cast list

References

External links
 
 
 

Films directed by Phil Rosen
Melodrama films
American silent feature films
American black-and-white films
Silent American drama films
1925 drama films
1925 films
1920s English-language films
1920s American films